The men's 100 metres event at the 2008 World Junior Championships in Athletics was held in Bydgoszcz, Poland, at Zawisza Stadium on 8 and 9 July.

Medalists

Results

Final
9 July
Wind: -0.8 m/s

Semifinals
8 July

Semifinal 1
Wind: -0.6 m/s

Semifinal 2
Wind: +0.3 m/s

Semifinal 3
Wind: -0.4 m/s

Heats
8 July

Heat 1
Wind: -0.2 m/s

Heat 2
Wind: +1.1 m/s

Heat 3
Wind: +0.2 m/s

Heat 4
Wind: +0.1 m/s

Heat 5
Wind: +0.1 m/s

Heat 6
Wind: +0.5 m/s

Heat 7
Wind: -0.7 m/s

Heat 8
Wind: -0.7 m/s

Heat 9
Wind: -0.7 m/s

Participation
According to an unofficial count, 75 athletes from 60 countries participated in the event.

References

100 metres
100 metres at the World Athletics U20 Championships